Tonight You Look Like a Spider is the debut album of David Yow, released on June 25, 2013 by Joyful Noise Recordings.

Track listing

Personnel 
David Yow – Instruments
Pete Lyman – mastering

Release history

References

External links 
 

2013 albums
Joyful Noise Recordings albums
David Yow albums
Sound collage albums